Souri is a town in the Alibori Department of Benin.
 

Populated places in Benin